Marko Petković (born 3 September 1992) is a Serbian footballer who plays as a right back.

Club career

OFK Beograd
Petković made his professional debut with OFK's senior team in the 2010-11 season. By the end of that season he made 17 league appearances that season. Overall, Petković spent a total of eight years in OFK Beograd from the time he was enrolled in the youth system.

Red Star Belgrade
Right at the transfer deadline, Petković signed with Red Star Belgrade at the end of August 2013. On November 20, 2013, it was announced that teammate and right-back Marko Vešović was injured, resulting in Petković being called up by coach Slaviša Stojanović afterwards.

Spartak Moscow
On 1 July 2017, he signed a contract with the Russian Premier League champion FC Spartak Moscow. He was released from his Spartak contract on 8 January 2019.

Honvéd
On 11 January 2022, Petković signed a 1.5-year contract with Honvéd in Hungary.

International career
He was member of the Serbia national under-19 football team and began captaining the Serbia national under-21 football team in 2013. He made his debut for the senior squad on 13 November 2015 in a friendly against Czech Republic as a 82nd-minute substitute for Nenad Tomović.

Career statistics

Club

International

Honours
Red Star Belgrade
 Serbian SuperLiga: 2013–14, 2015–16

Spartak Moscow
 Russian Super Cup: 2017

References

External sources
 Marko Petković at Utakmica.rs
 

1992 births
Living people
Sportspeople from Sremska Mitrovica
Serbian footballers
Serbian expatriate footballers
Association football defenders
Serbia youth international footballers
Serbia under-21 international footballers
Serbia international footballers
OFK Beograd players
Red Star Belgrade footballers
FC Spartak Moscow players
C.D. Tondela players
FK TSC Bačka Topola players
Budapest Honvéd FC players
Serbian SuperLiga players
Russian Premier League players
Primeira Liga players
Nemzeti Bajnokság I players
Serbian expatriate sportspeople in Russia
Serbian expatriate sportspeople in Portugal
Serbian expatriate sportspeople in Hungary
Expatriate footballers in Russia
Expatriate footballers in Portugal
Expatriate footballers in Hungary